Walter Irving McCoy (December 8, 1859 – July 17, 1933) was a United States representative from New Jersey and later was an Associate Justice and Chief Justice of the Supreme Court of the District of Columbia.

Education and career
Born in Troy, New York, on December 8, 1859, McCoy attended the public schools, Troy Academy, Phillips Exeter Academy and Princeton College. He received an Artium Baccalaureus degree in 1882 from Harvard University, an Artium Magister degree in 1886 from the same institution and a Bachelor of Laws in 1886 from Harvard Law School. He was admitted to the bar and practiced law in New York City, New York from 1886 to 1914. He was a trustee of the village of South Orange, New Jersey from  1893 to 1895, from 1901 to 1905, and again in 1910. McCoy was a delegate to the 1904 and 1908 Democratic National Conventions, and was vice president of the Essex County, New Jersey Democratic committee.

Congressional service
McCoy was elected as a Democrat to the United States House of Representatives of the 62nd and 63rd United States Congresses and served from March 4, 1911, until October 3, 1914, when he resigned to accept a federal judgeship.

Federal judicial service
McCoy was nominated by President Woodrow Wilson on September 29, 1914, to an Associate Justice seat on the Supreme Court of the District of Columbia (now the United States District Court for the District of Columbia) vacated by Associate Justice Job Barnard. He was confirmed by the United States Senate on October 2, 1914, and received his commission the same day. His service terminated on May 22, 1918, due to his elevation to be Chief Justice of the same court.

McCoy was nominated by President Wilson on May 16, 1918, to the Chief Justice seat on the Supreme Court of the District of Columbia (now the United States District Court for the District of Columbia) vacated by Chief Justice J. Harry Covington. He was confirmed by the Senate on May 22, 1918, and received his commission the same day. His service terminated on December 8, 1929, due to his retirement.

Later years and death
McCoy resided in Washington, D.C., until 1932, when he moved to Cambridge, Massachusetts, where he died on July 17, 1933. He was interred at Oakwood Cemetery in Troy.

References

Sources

 
 Walter Irving McCoy at The Political Graveyard

1859 births
1933 deaths
Harvard Law School alumni
Democratic Party members of the United States House of Representatives from New Jersey
Judges of the United States District Court for the District of Columbia
United States district court judges appointed by Woodrow Wilson
20th-century American judges
People from South Orange, New Jersey
Phillips Exeter Academy alumni
Princeton University alumni
Burials at Oakwood Cemetery (Troy, New York)
Harvard College alumni